Gaozong is the temple name of several Chinese monarchs. It can refer to:

 Emperor Yuan of Han (reign: 49 BC–33 BC)
 Emperor Gaozong of Tang (reign: 649–683)
 Emperor Gaozong of Song (reign: 1127–1162)
 Qianlong Emperor of the Qing dynasty (reign: 1735-1799)

See also 
 Gojong (disambiguation) (Korean romanization)

Temple name disambiguation pages